Club NXT is the youth academy of Belgian football club Club Brugge. The most senior team of Club NXT acts as Club Brugge's reserve team, and competes in the Challenger Pro League, the second flight of Belgian football.

History
On 1 July 2020, Belgian Pro League side Club Brugge announced that they would be rebranding their youth academy to Club NXT. On 13 August 2020, it was announced that the club's reserve team would play in the Challenger Pro League, the second flight of Belgian football, for the 2020–21 season after becoming champions in the Reserve Pro League the year before.

Club NXT played its first match in the second division on 22 August 2020 against RWDM47. On 30 August 2020, Thomas Van den Keybus scored the club's first goal against Lommel in a 2–2 draw. The following season, Club NXT changed grounds. The youth team will be playing their home games in the Schiervelde Stadion in Roeselaere, 25 kilometers from the Jan Breydelstadium. The stadium will be renamed to 'The NEST'.

For the 2022–23 season, it was decided that 4 reserve teams would partake in the Challenger Pro League. Based on the final standings of the Reserve Pro League, this meant that Club NXT would make its return and be joined by Jong Genk, RSCA Futures and SL16 FC.

On 15 June 2022, Brugge named Nicky Hayen as the new coach for Club NXT. This happened 10 days after Guillian Preud'homme was announced as the separate CEO for Club NXT and Club YLA.

Results

Players

Current squad

See also
 Club Brugge KV

References

External links
 Club NXT official website

 
Club Brugge KV
Belgian reserve football teams
Football clubs in Bruges
 Association football clubs established in 2020
2020 establishments in Belgium